Captain Star is a 1997 animated television series created by Steven Appleby and is based on Appleby's comic Rockets Passing Overhead. It stars Richard E. Grant as the voice of Captain Jim Star. The show as produced by Cosgrove Hall Films and HTV.

13 half-hour episodes were produced and aired from 1997 to 1998.

Plot
The story of Captain Star centers on the crew of a rocket ship called The Boiling Hell, who have been ordered to a dry planet known as "The Nameless Planet", at the Ragged Edge of the Universe, in order to wait for their next assignment. The ship's crew consists of the deeply egocentric and often paranoid Captain Star, the Science Officer Scarlett, the nine-headed, six-armed mutant Engineer/Stoker "Limbs" Jones, and the fish-keeping milquetoast Navigator Black. They are later joined by a robot, Jim-Bob-Bob, who does laundry duty and several other acts of menial servitude.

Captain Star is introduced in the opening theme song as "the greatest hero any world has ever known". A legendary explorer who has hundreds of planets named after him, Captain Star's birthday is a holiday throughout the entire universe. Throughout the program, the characters await further orders from Mission Control which never come, and they seem to have been waiting on The Nameless Planet for so long that Navigator Black has had time to construct a fish restaurant on the Nameless Planet. It is unclear whether Mission Control has simply forgotten about Star and his crew, but it is implied they have spared Captain Star the indignity of forced retirement, instead letting him stay a hero to the public. Events occurring on and off the planet frequently require Star's intervention.

Main characters

Captain Jim Star (voiced by Richard E. Grant) — Groomed from birth to be a starship captain, Captain Star is regarded as the greatest captain in the fleet. He left the Captains' Academy at age 12 to spend a year as a trainee under Captain Ned Nova of the Merry Cheeser, who had named 115 planets after himself, the record before Star surpassed him. Captain Star is roughly 127 "space years" old, which appears to make him a man in his 50s in his society. Not humble, though never excessively arrogant, Captain Star believes himself to be a hero and feels deserving of his pervading acclaim. He is often oblivious to danger and to the advice and concerns of his crew. Unquestioningly loyal, Star firmly believes that his orders will eventually come.

First Officer Scarlett (voiced by Denica Fairman) — A strong, brave, redheaded woman, and an accomplished scientist, Scarlett often saves the day through her scientific endeavours. Scarlett's logic and investigative mood are a stark contrast to Captain Star's tendency to improvise in an emergency. On The Nameless Planet, where Captain Star has no ship to command or adventures to lead, Scarlett handles most of his command duties.

Atomic Engine Stoker "Limbs" Jones (voiced by Adrian Edmondson) — Mutated in an atomic accident, "Limbs" Jones has nine heads and six arms. Each of Jones' heads accommodates a different part of his brain, causing each head to have a slightly different personality. Jones is a cat lover, having sequentially named pet cats Sputnik 1 through 374. Conversations between Jones' many heads and other members of the crew often lead them to become impatient and annoyed with him.

Navigator Black (voiced by Kerry Shale/Gary Martin) — Once the navigator of the Boiling Hell, Navigator Black sets up a small fish-shaped restaurant on The Nameless Planet and becomes the cook. Obsessed with fish, the restaurant is filled with aquariums. Black often swims with his fish, and even creates a brain-computer interface device that depicts their thoughts. Black has a nervous temperament and often panics under pressure. A running gag in the show is Navigator Black's inability to tell his left from his right.

Minor characters
Captain Bloater (Gary Martin)

Jasper Quilt (Gary Martin)

Captain Spratt (Denica Fairman)

Story format and themes
Many episodes of Captain Star begin with a flashback to the Boiling Hell's sublime missions, which is then immediately contrasted with their abandonment on The Nameless Planet as an bygone and over-the-hill crew. These flashbacks set the tone for the episode and foreshadow the story's theme. At the end of each episode, while sitting in his wheelbarrow, Captain Star recites an entry into his Captain's Diary which begins, "Uneventful day", followed by a short witticism which adds up the moral of the story.

A small moon in very close orbit of The Nameless Planet, called The Low-Flying Moon, often flies overhead, lifting objects off of the ground for a few seconds.

For a children's television program, Captain Star deals with unusually advanced themes. The primary theme throughout the series is of society's treatment of the aged. While Captain Star appears to be strong and healthy and continues to save the universe, after several years of distinguished service, Mission Control sweeps him under the rug by sending him to the edge of the universe to an unnamed planet and has him remain there without any orders to carry out. Despite continuing to prove his usefulness, there is an ageist undertone that Mission Control assumes that he is no longer a valuable asset because of his age and extensive service.

Many episodes feature a popular TV show titled "Star of Space" in which actors portray the crew of the Boiling Hell in many of Captain Star's most heroic missions. Captain Star is presented as a James Bond-like hero, handsome and virile, who saves the day almost effortlessly. The episodes exaggerate his role in events while minimizing the contributions of his crew — most conspicuously presenting strong and scientifically accomplished first officer Scarlett as a bimbo and damsel in distress. Even when watching events that had just occurred earlier in the episode, the entire crew, except for Scarlett, regard the reenactments as mostly historically accurate, emphasizing the role of television as a means to control public perception of people and events.

While Captain Star is removed from the public eye, he continues to be promoted as a hero in public propaganda. Keeping him on active duty, while separated from the public by assigning him to the Ragged Edge of the Universe, the public can keep regarding him as a hero who is in his prime forever. His birthday is a public holiday throughout the universe, an occasion which allows him to be presented as a larger than life hero figure and promoted as a role model. While not presenting as dystopian, it is implied that the government is exploiting Captain Star's fame, presumably as a recruitment tool and to encourage patriotism, unity, and support for the government.

115 space years prior to the events of the program, Captain Star's former captain, Ned Nova, was ordered into retirement. Ignoring orders, Nova fled in his ship, the Merry Cheeser. Captain Star was ordered to arrest his former captain and chased the Merry Cheeser to a black hole. Refusing to retire, Nova piloted his ship into the black hole. He was discovered in the present day in suspended animation in the stomach of a space slug on The Nameless Planet. Star decided to let him leave in his rocketship and declared that he could never have been Ned Nova because he was only half Ned Nova's age (thanks to his preservation inside the space slug). While an act of loyalty to his former captain and role model, his willingness to preserve an idealized image of Nova by refusing to arrest him and turn him over to Mission Control in disgrace ironically mirrors Mission Control's decision to preserve an idealized image of Star himself by exiling him on The Nameless Planet.

The program frequently presents commercialism in an absurd light. The opening theme reveals that the voyages that made Captain Star the greatest hero any world has ever known were missions in which he travelled to inhabited planets and renamed them after himself (much as explorers during the colonial era would rename and claim inhabited lands for Europe), and sell them things that they do not need, such as a group of aliens who purchase umbrellas before returning to their underwater homes. In the second episode, a "hard sell droid" attempts to sell the crew a carpet and not taking "no" for an answer. The crew are eventually forced to dismantle the droid, revealing that it had a brain the size of a pea. Many episodes feature unlikely Captain Star-themed products and memorabilia, such as a croquet set using a tee and hoops shaped like Captain Star's head, demonstrating the rampant consumerism surrounding Star's identity and likeness.

Episodes

Pilot (1992)

Season 1 (1997)

Season 2 (1998)

Broadcast
The series was broadcast on ITV in the UK and Teletoon in Canada. Cartoon Network and Locomotion in Latin America, Nickelodeon in the UK, and Space in Canada.
The show was never broadcast in the USA.

Home video
At least one VHS release of Captain Star is known to exist, containing the first three episodes of the series.

References

External links
Co-production diary
Captain Star comic strip collection

 

1997 British television series debuts
1998 British television series endings
1990s British animated television series
1990s British children's television series
1990s British science fiction television series
1997 Canadian television series debuts
1998 Canadian television series endings
1990s Canadian animated television series
1990s Canadian science fiction television series
British children's animated science fiction television series
Canadian children's animated science fiction television series
British comic strips
ITV children's television shows
Television shows produced by Harlech Television (HTV)
Teletoon original programming
Television shows based on comic strips
Television series by DHX Media
Television series by Cosgrove Hall Films
Fox Family Channel original programming